The 2020–21 George Washington Colonials men's basketball team represented George Washington University during the 2020–21 NCAA Division I men's basketball season. The team was led by second-year head coach Jamion Christian, and played their home games at Charles E. Smith Center in Washington, D.C. as a member of the Atlantic 10 Conference. They finished the season 5-12, 3-5 in A-10 Play to finish in 11th place. They defeated Fordham in the first round of the A-10 tournament before losing in the second round to George Mason.

Previous season
The Colonials finished the 2019–20 season with a 12–20 record and a 6–12 record in Atlantic 10 play. They were eliminated by Fordham in the opening round of the 2020 Atlantic 10 men's basketball tournament.

Roster

Schedule and results 

|-
!colspan=9 style=|Non-conference regular season

|-
!colspan=12 style=|Atlantic 10 regular season

|-
!colspan=12 style=| A-10 tournament

References

George Washington Colonials men's basketball seasons
George Washington Colonials
George Washington Colonials men's basketball
George Washington Colonials men's basketball